Varvara is a village and municipality in the Yevlakh Rayon of Azerbaijan.  It has a population of 1,634.

Notable natives 

 Fariz Madatov — National Hero of Azerbaijan.

References 

Populated places in Yevlakh District